Mineral Springs, Tennessee may refer to the following places in Tennessee:
Mineral Springs, Marion County, Tennessee
Mineral Springs, Overton County, Tennessee